The monthly highest-selling ringtones in Japan were ranked by the Recording Industry Association of Japan from August 2006 until February 2009, on the , also referred to by its formal name the . The ringtone sales market was the highest certified digital market in Japan at the time. Charts were released on the 20th of the following month.

In April 2009, the chart was replaced with the RIAJ Digital Track Chart, a weekly chart tracking  as opposed to ringtones. This new chart retained the formal name for RIAJ's digital chart, Yūryō Ongaku Haishin Chart, but not Reco-kyō Chart (this solely referring to the monthly ringtone chart).

Greeeen was the most successful charting artist in this era, topping the charts for seven months. Both Greeeen and Kumi Koda had four #1 hits, the largest number of hits (Greeeen's "Ai Uta," "Ayumi," "Kiseki" and "Setsuna," and Koda's "Ai no Uta," "Unmei," "Won't Be Long" with Exile and "Yume no Uta"). Other successfully charting artists include Exile with three months ("I Believe," "Ti Amo" and "Won't Be Long" with Kumi Koda) and Kobukuro with two months ("Aoku Yasashiku" and "Tsubomi").

Three songs are tied for the most months charted: Thelma Aoyama featuring SoulJa's "Soba ni Iru ne," Greeeen's "Kiseki" and Hikaru Utada's "Flavor of Life." All three songs were extremely successful in the digital market: "Flavor of Life" was announced as the most successful single of all-time in Japan totalling all formats (ringtone, cellphone full-length download, PC download, CD). In 2008, "Soba ni Iru ne," was announced to be the best-selling digital single of all time in Japan by Guinness World Records, an award given to Greeeen's "Kiseki" a year later.

Two songs charted for a total of two months on the chart, Greeeen's "Ai Uta," and "Sunao ni Naretara," a collaboration between R&B singer Juju with reggae/pop band Spontania, which was an answer song to their previous successful song "Kimi no Subete ni." Only one song that topped the monthly chart was a digital-only release with no physically released counterpart, Ayumi Hamasaki's "Together When...".

Chart history

See also
RIAJ
RIAJ Digital Track Chart
List of number-one digital singles of 2009 (Japan)
List of number-one digital singles of 2010 (Japan)
List of number-one digital singles of 2011 (Japan)
List of number-one digital singles of 2012 (Japan)

References

Reco-kyo Chart singles 2006-2009
Recording Industry Association of Japan
2006 in Japanese music
2007 in Japanese music
2008 in Japanese music
2009 in Japanese music